A riza (Russian: риза, "vestment," "robe"; Ukrainian: шати, shaty, "vestments") or oklad (оклад, "covered"), sometimes called a "revetment" in English, is a metal cover protecting an icon. It is usually made of gilt or silvered metal with repoussé work and is pierced to expose elements of the underlying painting. It is sometimes enameled, filigreed, or set with artificial, semi-precious or even precious stones and pearls.  Although the practice of using rizas originated in Byzantine art, the Russian term is often applied to Greek icons; in Greek the term is επένδυση ("coating"). Icons are described as επάργυρες or επίχρυσες: silver-covered and gold-covered, respectively.  

The purpose of a riza is to honour and venerate an icon, and ultimately the figure depicted on it, such as Christ or a saint. Because candles and lampadas (oil lamps) are burned in front of icons, and incense is used during services, icons can become darkened over time. The riza helps protect the icon. Riza is often placed over highly-venerated icons, such as the Panagia Ierosolymitissa icon in Jerusalem.  

A riza is designed specifically for the icon it is to cover.  It leaves open spaces where the face, hands, and feet of the icon's subject can be seen. The haloes on rizas are often more elaborate than on the original icons. Rizas for icons of the Theotokos (Mother of God) often have a crown on them.  The robes worn by the subjects often are adorned with pearls or jewels.  Usually a riza covers the entire surface of the icon except for the face and hands.  Especially in older examples, the riza may cover only the halo of the subject and is then called a venets.  Sometimes the riza includes a stylized torc or gorget (neck ring), called a tsata in Russian.

Some icons, especially late Byzantine ones, were designed with a riza from their first painting. Only the areas not covered by the riza were painted.

References

External links
"Oklad Cover for the Tikhvin Mother of God", Treasures of the Czars, Moscow Kremlin Museums, St. Petersburg Times

Christian religious objects
Eastern Orthodox icons
Christian iconography
Picture framing